The Miss Virginia Teen USA competition is the pageant that selects the representative for the state of Virginia in the Miss Teen USA pageant.

Virginia is one of the more successful states at Miss Teen USA, and is placed in the top twenty in terms of number and value of placements . Their most successful decade was the 1980s.

No Miss Virginia Teen USA has won the Miss Teen USA crown, but their highest placement came in the first year of competition, when Tina Marrocco placed 1st runner-up to Ruth Zakarian of New York.

Virginia ties the record for the most Teens to cross over to win the Miss Virginia USA title and compete at Miss USA with ten in all, two others have later been crowned in other states, Indiana and North Carolina. One of these is Kristi Lauren Glakas, a Triple Crown winner who competed at Miss USA 2004 and placed 3rd runner-up at Miss America 2006.

The current titleholder is Hannah Grau of Fredericksburg and was crowned on April 16, 2022 at Hylton Performing Arts Center in Manassas. She will represent Virginia for the title of Miss Teen USA 2022.

Results summary

Placements
1st runners-up: Tina Marrocco (1983)
3rd runners-up: Angela Thigpin (1986), Samantha Casey (2006)
Top 5: Misty Horn (1998)
Top 10: Kimberly Grigsby (1997), Kristi Lauren Glakas (1999), Tori Hall (2005), Emily Bruce (2007)
Top 12: Andrea Ballengee (1992)
Top 15: Megan Myrehn (2008), Jacqueline Carroll (2010)
Virginia holds a record of 11 placements at Miss Teen USA.

Winners 

1 Age at the time of the Miss Teen USA pageant

References

External links
Official website

Virginia
Women in Virginia